Andrey Yakunin (Андрей Владимирович Якунин) (born 1975) is a Russian businessman. He is the eldest son of Vladimir Yakunin, the former head of Russian Railways and a close Vladimir Putin associate.

Early life and family
His mother is Natalya. Andrey has a brother, Viktor Yakunin.

Andrey Yakunin lives in Hampstead, north London, where his son, Igor, attended the exclusive Highgate School and is now studying medicine at the University of Cambridge.

Education
Yakunin holds a Ph.D. in Finance and Credit from St. Petersburg State University, an MA degree in Economics and Mathematics, and EMBA Global from London Business School and Columbia University Graduate School of Business. He is an associate professor of economics at the St Petersburg State University.

Career
Yakunin runs VIY Management, a private equity and real estate investment company which he founded in 2006 with British, Israeli-born, investor Yair Ziv. The company facilitates foreign investment in Russia and is pursuing a plan to build hotels in Russia. Yakunin is also participating via VIYM in the construction of houses in St. Petersburg and in 2014 acquired Russian chocolatier French Kiss.

Yakunin is the chairman of the National Alternative Investment Management Association (NAIMA) in Russia.

He has British citizenship and citizenship of the Russian Federation.

Arrest in Norway
Yakunin was arrested in Norway 17. October charged with illegally flying a drone in Norwegian airspace. All Russian citizens were forbidden to operate any kind of drone from 28 of February 2022 following Russia invasion of Ukraine.

References

External links
Navalny Says 'Patriot' Yakunin's Children Live in Foreign Luxury Homes The Moscow Times.

1975 births
Living people
Alumni of London Business School
Saint Petersburg State University alumni
Academic staff of Saint Petersburg State University
Year of birth uncertain
Russian businesspeople in the United Kingdom